Terence "Terry" Hopwood (birth registered first ¼ 1945) is an English former professional rugby league footballer who played in the 1960s.

Background
Terry Hopwood's birth was registered in Wakefield district, West Riding of Yorkshire, England.

References

External links
Search for "Hopwood" at rugbyleagueproject.org

1945 births
Living people
English rugby league players
Rugby league halfbacks
Rugby league players from Wakefield
Wakefield Trinity players